Mark Ford (born 1 October 1961) is a South African former cricketer. He played in nine List A and twenty-two first-class matches from 1984/85 and 1990/91.

References

External links
 

1961 births
Living people
South African cricketers
Border cricketers
Eastern Province cricketers
Griqualand West cricketers
People from Makhanda, Eastern Cape
Cricketers from the Eastern Cape